This list comprises all players who have participated in at least one league match for Tulsa Roughnecks FC since the team's first USL season in 2015.

A "†" denotes players who only appeared in a single match.

B
 Brady Ballew
 Gibson Bardsley
 Laurie Bell
 Adam Black
 Chad Bond
 Ben Brewster

C
 Lucas Cordeiro

D
 Iarfhlaith Davoren

F
 Jake Feener

G
 Eli Galbraith-Knapp
 Mason Grimes

J
 Oscar Jimenez

L
 Andy Lorei
 Zac Lubin

M
 Henri Manhebo
 Cristian Mata
 Steven Miller

N
 Kyrian Nwabueze

O
 Sammy Ochoa

P
 Julian Portugal
 Ryan Price

V
 Kyle Venter

External links

Tulsa Roughnecks FC
 
Association football player non-biographical articles